The Chronicon Burgense is a collection of Latin annals that, together with the Annales Compostellani and the Chronicon Ambrosianum, may form a group of related histories sometimes called the Efemérides riojanas because they may have been compiled in La Rioja. The Chronicon Burgense is named after the Cathedral of Burgos, where it was discovered on one folio of a surviving thirteenth-century obituary/calendar. It deals primarily with matters in the Kingdom of Castile and may have been written at Burgos, the Castilian capital. It also touches on the Kingdom of Navarre (in which La Rioja lay) and covers the period from the Nativity of Jesus to the Battle of Las Navas de Tolosa in 1212. It uses the dating system of the Spanish era and not the Anno domini. It is a unique source for several details relating to early Castilian history. The following is an excerpt:

Editions
In Francisco de Berganza, ed. Antigüedades de España, II (Madrid: 1721), 560–62. 
In Enrique Flórez, ed. España Sagrada, XXIII (Madrid: 1767), 307–10. 
In Manuel Martínez Añíbarro y Rives, ed. Intento de un diccionario biográfico y bibliográfico de autores de la provincia de Burgos (Madrid: 1889), 49–50.
In A. Huici Miranda, ed. Las crónicas latinas de la Reconquista, I (Valencia: 1913), 27–39.

References
Conerly, Porter (1993). "Cronicones," p. 469. Dictionary of the Literature of the Iberian Peninsula, vol. 1. Germán Bleiberg, Maureen Ihrie, and Janet Pérez, edd. (Greenwood Publishing Group). 
Martínez Díez, Gonzalo (2005). El condado de Castilla, 711–1038: La historia frente a la leyenda. Marcial Pons Historia, p. 755.

Medieval Latin texts